The Wichita-Sedgwick County Historical Museum is a non-profit 501(c)(3) organization dedicated to preserving and presenting the local history of Wichita and Sedgwick County, Kansas, United States. It is located at 204 South Main (southeast of the corner of Main and William streets), and east of the former Wichita Public Library.

History

The museum was established in 1939 as the Wichita Public Museum. Today the museum resides in the original City Hall building designed by William T. Proudfoot and George W. Bird in 1890. Exhibits are housed on four floors and are open to the public six days a week for a nominal admission fee. The museum is supported in part through city and county funding and through the support of its sizable membership base.

The museum has been accredited by the American Alliance of Museums since 1972. It has been listed on the National Register of Historic Places since 1971.

See also
 History of Wichita, Kansas
 National Register of Historic Places listings in Sedgwick County, Kansas

References

Further reading
 Wichita : Illustrated History 1868 to 1880; Eunice Chapter; 52 pages; 1914. (PDF)
 History of Wichita and Sedgwick County Kansas : Past and present; O.H. Bentley; 454 + 479 pages; 1910. (Vol 1) (Vol 2)
 Standard Atlas of Sedgwick County, Kansas; Geo. A. Ogle; 78 pages; 1905. (Online)
 Historical Atlas of Sedgwick County, Kansas; John Edwards; 50 pages; 1882. (Online)

External links
 

Museums established in 1939
Museums in Wichita, Kansas
Courthouses on the National Register of Historic Places in Kansas
History museums in Kansas
Institutions accredited by the American Alliance of Museums
1939 establishments in Kansas
National Register of Historic Places in Wichita, Kansas